Miramar Esporte Clube, commonly known as Miramar, is a Brazilian football club based in Cabedelo, Paraíba state.

History
The club was founded on March 28, 1928. Miramar won the Campeonato Paraibano Second Level in 2001.

Achievements
 Campeonato Paraibano Second Level:
 Winners (1): 2001

Stadium

Miramar Esporte Clube play their home games at Estádio Leonardo Vinagre da Silveira, commonly known as Estádio da Graça, located in João Pessoa. The stadium has a maximum capacity of 6,000 people.

References

Association football clubs established in 1928
Football clubs in Paraíba
1928 establishments in Brazil